Consuelo Rodríguez may refer to:

 Consuelo Rodríguez Píriz (1960–2021), Spanish conservative politician
 Consuelo Rodríguez (athlete), Mexican paralympian at the 1992 Summer Paralympics